Gordon James may refer to:

 Gordon James (actor) (1877–1949), English actor
 Gordon James (priest) (1922–2000), Archdeacon of Margam
 Gordon C. James, American political consultant